Sergey Petrik (born 1 November 1967) is a Russian former alpine skier who competed in the 1988 Winter Olympics.

References

External links
 

1967 births
Living people
Russian male alpine skiers
Olympic alpine skiers of the Soviet Union
Alpine skiers at the 1988 Winter Olympics